The Roman Catholic Diocese of Daloa is a diocese located in the city of Daloa in the Ecclesiastical province of Gagnoa in Côte d'Ivoire.

History
 April 9, 1940: Established as Apostolic Vicariate of Sassandra from the Apostolic Vicariate of Costa d’Avorio
 September 14, 1955: Promoted as Diocese of Daloa

Special churches
The Cathedral is the Cathédrale du Christ-Roi in Daloa.

Leadership, in reverse chronological order
 Bishops of Daloa (Roman rite), below
 Bishop Marcellin Yao Kouadio (since 2018.04.25)
 Bishop Maurice Konan Kouassi (2005.03.22 - 2018.04.25)
 Bishop Pierre-Marie Coty (1975.11.20 – 2005.03.22)
 Bishop Pierre-Eugène Rouanet, S.M.A. (1956.07.04 - 1975.11.20)
 Bishop Jean Marie Etrillard, S.M.A. (1956.02.29 – 1956.07.04), appointed Bishop of Gagnoa
 Vicar Apostolic of Sassandra (Roman rite), below
 Bishop Alphonse Charles Kirmann, S.M.A. (1940.04.09 – 1955.03.25)

See also
Roman Catholicism in Côte d'Ivoire
 List of Roman Catholic dioceses in Côte d'Ivoire

Sources
 GCatholic.org
 Catholic Hierarchy

Roman Catholic dioceses in Ivory Coast
Christian organizations established in 1940
Roman Catholic dioceses and prelatures established in the 20th century
Sassandra-Marahoué District
Daloa
Roman Catholic Ecclesiastical Province of Gagnoa